Israelsson is a surname. Notable people with the surname include:

Erik Israelsson (born 1989), Swedish association footballer
Fet-Mats Israelsson (died 1677), "petrified man" found in 1719
Karl-Erik Israelsson (1929–2013), Swedish long jumper
Margareta Israelsson (born 1954), Swedish Social Democratic politician
Mathias Israelsson (born 1994), Swedish ice hockey goaltender
Sven Israelsson (1920–1989), Swedish Nordic combined skier who competed in the late 1940s

See also
Israel's Son

Swedish-language surnames